is a Japanese manga series written and illustrated by Masami Yuki. It was first serialized in Shogakukan's seinen manga magazine Monthly Big Comic Spirits from January 2018 to October 2019, and later transferred to Weekly Big Comic Spirits in January 2020. It is the story of Ise Shinkurō Moritoki, who would later become known as Hōjō Sōun, the first head of the Later Hōjō clan, one of the most powerful samurai families in Japan in the Sengoku period. The series depicts him as a member of the Ise clan, holding public office in the Muromachi Shogunate, telling the story of how he became a feudal lord.

Publication
Written and illustrated by Masami Yuki, Shinkurō, Hashiru! was first serialized in Shogakukan's seinen manga magazine Monthly Big Comic Spirits from January 27, 2018, to October 26, 2019, and it was later transferred to Weekly Big Comic Spirits on January 11, 2020. Shogakukan has collected its chapters into individual tankōbon volumes. The first volume was released on August 9, 2018. As of September 12, 2022, eleven volumes have been released.

Volume list

References

External links
 

Historical anime and manga
Masami Yuki
Seinen manga
Shogakukan manga